Mohammad Muntasser (Arabic:محمد منتصر) (born 8 September 1989) is a Qatari footballer. He currently plays as a goalkeeper .

Career

Al-Wakrah
Mohammad Muntasser started his career at Al-Wakrah and is a product of the Al-Wakrah's youth system. On 15 October 2011, Muntasser made his professional debut for Al-Wakrah against Qatar SC in the Pro League, replacing Ali Rahma Al-Marri .

Al-Markhiya
On 29 June 2017, he left Al-Wakrah and signed with Al-Markhiya. On 15 October 2017, Muntasser made his professional debut for Al-Makhiya against Al-Rayyan in the Pro League .

Al-Gharafa
On 2 January 2020, he left Al-Markhiya and signed with Al-Gharafa. On 28 February 2020, Muntasser made his professional debut for Al-Gharafa against Al-Sailiya SC in the Pro League, replacing Qasem Burhan .

Umm Salal
On 30 August 2020, left Al-Gharafa and signed with Umm Salal.

External links

References

Living people
1989 births
Qatari footballers
Al-Wakrah SC players
Al-Markhiya SC players
Al-Gharafa SC players
Umm Salal SC players
Qatar Stars League players
Qatari Second Division players
Association football goalkeepers
Place of birth missing (living people)